The 2023 V.League 1, known as the Night Wolf V.League 1 for sponsorship reasons, is the 67th professional season of the top-flight football league in Vietnam, the 24th under the V.League 1 name. The season is scheduled to commence on 3 February 2023.

The defending champions from the 2022 V.League 1 is Hanoi FC

This season will be the last to have an intra-year schedule (spring-to-autumn). There will also be a break from 20 February to 6 April for the 2023 AFC U-20 Asian Cup and from 18 April to 19 May for the 2023 Southeast Asian Games in Cambodia.

Changes from previous season

Team changes

To V.League 1
Promoted from V.League 2
 Hanoi Police
 Khanh Hoa FC

From V.League 1
Relegated to V.League 2
 Saigon FC

Name changes
 Promoted side People’s Public Security FC changed their name to Hanoi Police in November 2022.
 Nam Dinh FC changed their name to Thep Xanh Nam Dinh on 4 January 2023 due to sponsorship reasons.

Rule changes
The league will return to the split season format as played in the 2020 season where in the latter half the top eight teams will play each other in the championship group, while the remaining six teams will face each other in the relegation group. In addition, no teams will be qualified for the AFC Champions League or AFC Cup competitions this season (all 2023–24 AFC club competition slots were already distributed in the 2022 season). Teams will also be allotted a non-naturalized Vietnamese player slot that will not be counted towards their foreign player allotment.

Prize money

1st Place - 3 billion VND (127931 USD) => 5 billion VND (213219 USD)
2nd Place - 1.5 billion VND (63965 USD) => 2.5 billion VND (106609 USD)
3rd Place - 750 million VND (31982 USD) => 1.25 billion VND (53304 USD).

Participating clubs by province

Personnel and kits

Managerial changes

Foreign players
Teams are allowed to register 3 foreign  and 1 AFC qualified players. Starting this season, teams will be allotted an extra slot for 1 unnaturalized overseas Vietnamese player that will not be counted against their foreign player allotment. Hanoi and Haiphong will be allowed to register up to 5 foreign and 1 AFC qualified players for the 2023–24 AFC Champions League.
 Players name in bold indicates the player was registered after the start of the season.

Dual nationality players
 Players name in bold indicates the player was registered after the start of the season.
 Player's name in italics indicates Overseas Vietnamese players whom have obtained a Vietnamese passport and citizenship, therefore being considered as local players.

Notes:
  Capped for Vietnam national team.

Regular season

League table

Position by round

Results

Championship round
Points and goals carried over in full from the regular season.

Positions by round
Below the positions per round are shown. As teams did not all start with an equal number of points, the initial pre-playoffs positions are also given.

Relegation round
Points and goals carried over in full from the regular season.

Positions by round
Below the positions per round are shown. As teams did not all start with an equal number of points, the initial pre-playoffs positions are also given.

Season statistics

Top scorers

Source: Soccerway

Hat-tricks

Clean sheets

Attendances

By round

By team

References

Vietnamese Super League seasons
Vietnam
2023 in Vietnamese football